Kodikuthimala, also known as the Ooty of Malappuram, is a hill station in Vettathur and Thazhekode villages, in Kerala, India.

The British hoisted their flag on this hilltop during a survey, thus getting the name Kodikuthimala. Around 70 acres of land in this area is earmarked by the Tourism Department for various projects. Kodikuthimala, at an altitude of 1,713-ft above sea level, has a watch tower that is visited by tourists because of the vantage point it offers.
It is located 9 km from Perintalmanna, 32 km from Malappuram, 66 km from Palakkad and 82 km from Calicut.

References

External links

Hill stations in Kerala
Populated places in the Western Ghats
Tourist attractions in Malappuram district
Geography of Malappuram district